Arctium nemorosum is a species of flowering plant belonging to the family Asteraceae.

Its native range is Europe to Caucasus.

References

nemorosum